Marcia trionfale (internationally released as Victory March) is a 1976 Italian drama film written and directed by Marco Bellocchio.  It was coproduced by France (where it was released as La Marche triomphale) and West Germany (where is known as Triumphmarsch). For this film Michele Placido was awarded with a Nastro d'Argento for best actor and with a special David di Donatello. It was shot in a disused barracks in Reggio Emilia.

Cast 
Franco Nero: Captain Asciutto  
 Michele Placido: Paolo Passeri
 Miou-Miou: Rosanna
 Patrick Dewaere: Lt. Baio
 Nino Bignamini: Guancia
 Alessandro Haber: Belluomo  
 Peter Berling
 Ekkehardt Belle
 Gisela Hahn

See also 

 List of Italian films of 1976

References

External links

 

1976 films
Films directed by Marco Bellocchio
Italian drama films
1976 drama films
Films scored by Nicola Piovani
1970s Italian films